Euskefeurat is a music group from Piteå, Sweden.

Euskefeurat is an adjective in the local Norrbottnic dialect which means "tired" or "worn out". Founded in 1977, Euskefeurat is a local patriotic leftleaning band from the northern Swedish town of Piteå. It stopped in 1994 and restarted in 2005. Among the members are Ronny Eriksson, Bengt Ruthström, Dan Engman and Stefan Isaksson. Various others have been part during different periods.

On 9 April 2005, Euskeufeurat came together for an evening and soon after, during the summer of 2005, Euskefeurat could be heard and seen in Harads, Pajala, Skule, Burträsk and Piteå, all in northern Sweden.

Many Euskefeurat songs are sung in Pitemål, a local dialect, which is said to have been good for the popularity of the dialect.

Discography

Ägge borte katta
Published: 1982

People: Ronny Eriksson, Bengt Ruthström, Stefan Isaksson, Irene Danielsson, Erling Fredriksson, Arn Johansson

Songs:
Euskefeurat
Mutta herra jumala
Lillpitevisan
Vaggvisa
Bonden o björn
Sommarens sista kväll
Båkaspännarn
Hand i hand
Altersbruk
Seskarövisan
Folke
Namnlösas här

Levandes
Published: 1984

People: Ronny Eriksson, Bengt Ruthström, Stefan Isaksson, Irene Danielsson, Erling Fredriksson, Arn Johansson

Songs:
Skweelarn
Innerst inne är vi alla folkpartister
Deborah
Konsumvisan
Daniel och Siv
Hör du Bengt
Tankar på nattgammal is
Det är hit man kommer när man kommer hem
Vårvisa
Stockholm marathon
Länge har vi väntat

Aotom Taotom
Published: 1986

People: Ronny Eriksson, Bengt Ruthström, Stefan Isaksson, Sonia Harr, Dan Engman, Arn Johansson

Songs:
Ao'tom tao'tom
Älva hon glema
Pessimiskonsulten
Mathilda
Tips och penninglotter
Kvad
Sjunde dagen
Vöre val'e
Handelsresanden
Apparata
Norrbotten

Hoven droven
Published: 1988

People: Ronny Eriksson, Bengt Ruthström, Stefan Isaksson, Sonia Harr, Dan Engman, Arn Johansson

Songs:
Då å dåij
Mer och mer och mer
Vad jag är bra
Bannes Johannes
Till Ingela
En fri man
Jag skiter i det sexuella
He'ven
Storswänsken
Till Elias

Bondångersånger
Published: 1990

People: Ronny Eriksson, Bengt Ruthström, Stefan Isaksson, Sonia Harr, Dan Engman, Per Isaksson

Songs:
Bondångersång
Nya gungor & karuseller
Gösta
Konjak & nazister
Gunde Svan
Annagreta
Lingonrap
Tröstvals för bondånger
Bluebird från Kall
Gnölar'n
Requiem
Bondånger

Hipp Happ
Published: 1993

People: Ronny Eriksson, Bengt Ruthström, Stefan Isaksson, Dan Engman, Per Isaksson

Songs:
Marknasvisa
Min brorsa
Ge dom vad dom tål
Gropen
Härifrån till Bryssel
Jag måste vara galen om regeringen är klok
Passar det dig
Leonard Larssons testamente
Farssan är död
Inte odumt
Ingen alls

Sista färden hem till byn
Published: 1994

People: Ronny Eriksson, Bengt Ruthström, Stefan Isaksson, Dan Engman, Per Isaksson, Robert Lundberg, among others

Songs:
Euskefeurat
Fri man
Vischan blues
Bonden och björn
Aotom taotom
Jämna plågor
Minnen
Jag vill städa i Europa
Konjak & nazister
Min brorsa
Jag skiter i det sexuella
Gunde Svan
Tankar på nattgammal is
Jag måste vara galen om regeringen är klok
Med guds hjälp och bingolotto
Inte odumt
Squelar'n
Kvad
Det är hit man kommer när man kommer hem

Lurv
Published: 2008

People: Ronny Eriksson, Bengt Ruthström, Stefan Isaksson, Dan Engman, Per Isaksson, Robert Lundberg

Gråtvals
Åh, Lönsamhet
Sankte Per
Gode Gud i himmelen
75-års Renault
Säg haver ni hört
Littorin Humpa
Far min
Flyktingarna
Husvagnblues
Evert stod på lagårdsbacken
När jag en gång dör
Leonard Larssons testamente
Hem till Altersbruk
Vöre vale
Spela Creedence

Aldrig för sent att ge opp

Published:2010
People: Ronny Eriksson, Bengt Ruthström, Stefan Isaksson, Dan Engman, Per Isaksson, Robert Lundberg

Nö'bert vä ve
Det mesta rår nog spriten för
Fullmånen lyser över skogen
Rosa Kata Alexandra Moa Margareta
Faster Aina
Gunnar
Vi sjöng "Arbetets söner"
Holger
Mosa'tramparn
Den officiella versionen
Nu pissar vi i brallorna igen
Perellin humppa
Aldrig för sent att ge opp
Apparata
Mathilda

Sånger från Hotaheiti 
 Published: 2014
 People: Ronny Eriksson, Bengt Ruthström, Kenneth Berg, Dan Engman, Per Isaksson, Robert Lundberg

 Åren går o tiden lider
 Långt från kusinerna i stan
 Hotaheiti
 Egentligen
 Holmström
 Förut ligger nära
 Snöslungan
 21 augusti
 Tjära o fjädrar
 Himlen var blå
 Helt utan egen förskyllan
 Bönhuset
 Alla ska vi dö en dag

External links
Homepage Euskefeurat
Page with lyrics

Swedish musical groups
Musical groups established in 1977
Piteå